The 2003 Golden Globes (Portugal) were the eight edition of the Golden Globes (Portugal).

Winners

Cinema:
Best Film: A Selva, with Leonel Vieira
Best Actress: Alexandra Lencastre, in O Delfim
nominated: Margarida Marinho, in Aparelho Voador a Baixa Altitude
Best Actor: Vítor Norte, in O Gotejar da Luz – Paixão em África
nominated: Rogério Samora, in O Delfim

Theatre:
Best Actress: Eunice Muñoz (A Casa do Lago, de Ernest Thompson)
Best Actor: Virgílio Castelo
Best Peça: My Fair Lady, encenado por Filipe La Féria

Music:
Best Performer: Carlos do Carmo (Nove Fados e uma Canção de Amor)
Best Group: Madredeus (CD Euforia e Electrónico)
Best Song: Momento – Uma espécie de Céu- Pedro Abrunhosa

Television:
Fiction and Comedy:
Best Program: O Processo dos Távoras
Best Actress: Alexandra Lencastre (Fúria de Viver)
Best Actor: Camacho Costa (Malucos do Riso e Às Duas por Três)Information:Best presenter: José Alberto Carvalho (Telejornal RTP)
Best Program: Telejornal (RTP)Entertainment:'''
Best Program: Herman SICBest Presentader: Catarina Furtado (Catarina.com'')

Award of Merit and Excellence :
José Hermano Saraiva

References

2002 film awards
2002 music awards
2002 television awards
Golden Globes (Portugal)
2003 in Portugal